Frente Despertar ('Wake up front') is a political coalition in Argentina. It participated in the 2019 general election, formed by Unite for Freedom and Dignity, the Union of the Democratic Centre, the Libertarian Party and the Democratic Party.

Its presidential candidate was the economist José Luis Espert, who announced on December 23 of 2018 his intention to participate in the presidential elections.

History
The alliance was about to be disbanded because Alberto Asseff's party, UNIR Constitutional Nationalist Party (the only party in the alliance that met the requirements to nominate a presidential candidate), stopped supporting the front. But a few days later, UNITE backed Espert's candidacy and ended up participating in the elections.

On July 14, 2021, the closing day for the presentation of alliances for the 2021 legislative elections, the Avanza Libertad coalition with parties from the center-right sector became official in the Province of Buenos Aires. The UCEDE, the Democratic Party and the Autonomist Party will participate in the coalition, as well as groups that are not yet, legally, political parties in the province, such as Republicans United and the Republican Libertarian Movement.

Proposals 
Frente Despertar's electoral platform has thirteen proposals; they were announced at the same time as Espert's candidacy, and posted on the coalition's website, where they are explained with more detail.

 Eliminate or reduce tariffs on imports to a low and uniform minimum
 Sign free trade agreements with any region or country that desires to access the local market.
 Remove tariffs on exports (called "retenciones")
 Focus on the most unprotected sectors.
 Transform welfare programs into disbursements in things like health and education plans and community kitchens.
 Lower the tax burden by eliminating and reducing taxes.
 Keep fiscal responsibility.
 Reduce political spending.
 End coparticipation and propose a political regionalization of the provinces to make more jurisdictions self-financing.
 End every industrial or regional promotion regime.
 End syndicalism and collective labour agreements.
 Reform the education system.
 Reform the Penal Code and the Procedure Code, imposing sentences of effective compliance and eliminate constitutional guarantees that favour criminals.

Electoral results

Elecciones presidenciales

National Congress elections

Chamber of Deputies

Senate

See also 

 José Luis Espert
 Union of the Democratic Centre

References

External links 
 Espert Presidente | Frente Despertar
 Inicio

Right-wing parties in Argentina
Political party alliances in Argentina
2018 establishments in Argentina
Political parties established in 2018
Liberalism
Libertarian parties